Gióng Festival (Vietnamese: Hội Gióng) is a traditional festival which is celebrated annually in many parts of Hanoi to honour the mythical hero, Thánh Gióng "Saint Giong," who is credited with defending the country against foreign enemies. The festival was listed on the UNESCO List of the Intangible Cultural Heritage.

References 

Culture of Hanoi
Masterpieces of the Oral and Intangible Heritage of Humanity
Festivals in Vietnam